Digby Hospital was a mental health facility in Digby, Devon, England.

History
The site was previously occupied by Digby Farm. The hospital, which was designed by Robert Stark Wilkinson using a Linear Corridor Plan layout, opened as City of Exeter Lunatic Asylum in September 1886. Digby and Sowton railway station, a station on the Avocet Line, was opened to service the hospital in 1908.

The asylum became Exeter City Mental Hospital in the 1920s and joined the National Health Service as Digby Hospital in 1948 before becoming known as Exe Vale Hospital (Digby Branch) in the 1970s. After the introduction of Care in the Community in the early 1980s, the hospital went into a period of decline and closed in 1986. The main building was subsequently converted into apartments and is now known as Digby Park.

See also
Exminster Hospital (a separate branch of Exe Vale Hospital)

References

Defunct hospitals in England
Hospitals in Devon
Hospital buildings completed in 1886
Hospitals established in 1886
1886 establishments in England
Former psychiatric hospitals in England
Hospitals disestablished in 1986
1986 disestablishments in England